Chalcosia venosa is a moth in the family Zygaenidae. It was described by Francis Walker in 1854 from Sri Lanka.

References

External links
"Chalcosia sp. (Chalcosia venosa?)". Biodiversity of Sri Lanka.

Moths described in 1854